The 11th constituency of Yvelines is a French legislative constituency in the Yvelines département.

Description

The 11th constituency of Yvelines lies in the middle of the department and forms part of the western suburbs of Paris.

The seat is one of the more left leaning in Yvelines and has elected PS deputies at the 1988, 1997 and 2012 elections.

At the 2012 it elected leading left winger Benoît Hamon who was appointed almost instantly to the government of Jean-Marc Ayrault.

Philippe Benassaya was elected at a 2020 by-election, following the appointment of Nadia Hai as Secretary of State to Minister of Territorial Development Jacqueline Gourault.

Historic Representation

Election results

2022

 
 
 
 
 
 
 
 
|-
| colspan="8" bgcolor="#E9E9E9"|
|-

2020 by-election

 
 
 
 
 
 
 
|-
| colspan="8" bgcolor="#E9E9E9"|
|-

2017

First round

Second round

2012

First round

Second round

2007

 
 
 
 
 
 
 
|-
| colspan="8" bgcolor="#E9E9E9"|
|-

2002

 
 
 
 
 
|-
| colspan="8" bgcolor="#E9E9E9"|
|-

1997

 
 
 
 
 
 
 
|-
| colspan="8" bgcolor="#E9E9E9"|
|-

Sources
Official results of French elections from 2002: "Résultats électoraux officiels en France" (in French).

11